Cobham Hall School is a private day and boarding school in the English parish of Cobham, Kent, for girls only in Years 7 to 11 and co-educational in the Sixth Form . It is a Round Square school and a member of the Girls' Schools Association. The school is housed in Cobham Hall, a Tudor era Grade I listed manor house situated in 150 acres of historic parkland on the edge of the Kent Downs. The school featured in the film Wild Child in 2008, as the fictional school that the characters attended, called Abbey Mount.

On 23 February 2021 it was announced that the school would become part of the Mill Hill School Foundation.

School
Cobham Hall was founded as an international boarding school for girls aged between eleven and eighteen by Bhicoo Batlivala in 1962. The school now accepts both day and boarding students. Since September 2022, Cobham Hall has also accepted boys into its Sixth Form. Approximately one-third of students are boarders, both UK and international; some 25 nationalities are represented.

Curriculum
Girls in Years 7 to 9 broadly follow the English National Curriculum alongside a skills-based development programme.  Girls in Middle School (up to Year 11) follow the GCSE curriculum.  In the Sixth Form, A Levels are studied as part of a broad curriculum which also encompasses the Extended Project Qualification, The Ivy House Award, Global Critical Thinking, The Duke of Edinburgh's Award or Service, Sport, and a Tutorial programme to support students through the university application process.  The school has a specialist EFL Department, as well as a CReSTeD accredited Student Support Department.

The school also offers a range of tailored programmes for international students, including a Pre-A Level Course. Intensive English Support programmes are available for those whose first language is not English.

The building

There has been a manor house on the site since the 12th century. The current building consists of a pair of 16th-century Tudor wings and a later classical central block, the 'Cross Wing'. Alterations were made by Sir William Chambers, c. 1767–70 The most notable feature of the interior is the two-storey Gilt Hall, c, 1770–81. The fourth earl of Darnley, who inherited in 1781, employed the architect James Wyatt extensively. The landscape designer Humphry Repton was hired to draw up a plan for the estate and two of his sons designed features of the building.

Cobham Hall remained the family home of the Earls of Darnley until 1957 and is now home to the school. As of 2014 it was open to the public on a limited number of days each year.

The building has been used as a film set. A scene in Agent Cody Banks 2 in which Frankie Muniz fights Keith Allen in a room full of priceless treasures was filmed in the Gilt Hall. Scenes from an adaption of Bleak House were filmed outside the building, and it was used in a few scenes in the comedy sketch show Tittybangbang. The Hall is used as the school 'Abbey Mount' in the 2008 film Wild Child starring Emma Roberts and as the Foundling Hospital in the CBBC adaptation of Hetty Feather.

Notable alumnae

Francesca Amfitheatrof, jewelry designer
Princess Antonia, Duchess of Wellington
Alex Crawford, journalist
Olivia Graham, Bishop of Reading
Mishal Husain, news presenter
Anjali Rao, television news presenter 
Annabel Heseltine, journalist and broadcaster
Jane Percy, Duchess of Northumberland
Mary Ann Sieghart, journalist
Kate French, modern pentathlete
Isabel dos Santos, daughter of the former President of Angola, and billionaire businesswoman
Romina Power, daughter of Tyrone Power, American-Italian singer known internationally as Al Bano and Romina Power
Catherine Fall, Baroness Fall

References

External links

Cobham Hall School official website
ISI Inspection Report
Profile on the ISC website

Grade I listed buildings in Kent
Gravesham
Country houses in Kent
Boarding schools in Kent
Girls' schools in Kent
Member schools of the Girls' Schools Association
Round Square schools
International Baccalaureate schools in England
Private schools in Kent
Educational institutions established in 1962
Grade I listed houses in Kent
1962 establishments in England